Don Rolando Reyes Sr. is a well-known Honduran cigar maker of Cuban origin formerly residing in Danlí, Honduras. He is a master blender, roller and is the creator of Cuba Aliados, Puros Indios and other famous cigar brands. Don Rolando is widely known throughout the cigar industry for his unusual work habits: he works at night when everyone has left, inspecting the day's production. He is married and has three children: a son, Rolando Reyes Jr., and two daughters, Oneida Reyes-Diez and Seida Reyes.

Early life
Rolando Reyes was born in 1924 into a large family of fourteen (seven boys and seven girls), in Zulueta, Las Villas Province, Cuba (now in Villa Clara Province). His father owned a trucking business, but unlike his siblings, he wished to become a tabacalero, a tobacconist. At nine years old, Rolando was apprenticed to Silvio Santana of the Tabacalera Pequeña in Zulueta, where he was taught all aspects of cigar making. He went to school at 8 in the morning until noon, and then worked in the factory from 1 (1300 hrs) in the afternoon until 9 at night (2100 hrs). After two years at Tabacalera Pequeña, he left there to work in the Aquilar factory in nearby Remedios.

Developing a Career in the Cigar Industry
In 1938, at the age of 14, he went to work at the José L. Piedra Cigar Factory in Guanajay, Pinar del Río Province, but later moved to Havana, Cuba to begin work at the H. Upmann factory. After leaving Upmann, he went to work in various factories, including José Gener, Partagàs, Romeo y Julieta and then he worked for the Batet Cigar Co. It was in these factories that he learned to roll the parejo (straight-sided) cigars. He learned to roll more complex and difficult figurados (shaped cigars), such as pyramides at the Josè Gener factory. He was able also to master the technique of rolling cigars without a mold and other techniques as well., He was later the first to offer the complex diadema (a large figurado) to the U. S. market.

Striking Out on His Own
In 1945, barely 21 years of age, Rolando moved to Placetas, Las Villas province, and established his own factory, Los Aliados. After a few years, he moved his factory to Havana where he operated successfully until 1968 when the Communist government of Fidel Castro confiscated his Los Aliados trademark, his factory and his personal belongings. At the time of the takeover, the factory was turning out 6 million hand-made cigars for the domestic market. The new government assigned him to work in the El Rey del Mundo cigar factory, but he refused so he was sent to the rice fields where he worked until he was able to emigrate to the United States.

Starting Anew
In 1971, Rolando Reyes Sr. was able to emigrate to the United States, arriving first in Miami, Florida. A short time later, with a $500 loan from his brother, he re-located his family to Jersey City, New Jersey and opened a small cigar shop.  He worked in a clothing factory during the day (knitting) to earn extra money to support his family and rolled cigars for sale in his shop in the evenings. The Jersey City location soon proved to be too small, so in 1973, he built a combination house/factory in Union City and moved his family and cigar production there changing the name of his cigar to Cuba Aliados. The company continues to operate offices in Union City.

The newly re-christened cigar was picked up by a national distributor (Cigars by Santa Clara). To keep up with the increased demand, in 1978, Reyes Sr. began production of Cuba Aliados in the Dominican Republic. Unsatisfied with the quality of the resultant cigars, he closed his Dominican operation and opened a new factory and retail operation in Miami, Florida in 1984, and cigar production continued in both Union City and Miami until all production moved to Honduras.

The Advent of Puros Indios
The success of the Cuba Aliados brand had its bumps due to litigation with JR Cigars that built a gap between Rolando Reyes Jr. and Rolando Reyes Sr. A new brand, Puros Indios, was introduced in late 1995 by Rolando Reyes Jr. Rolando Reyes Jr. Promoted came out with the Puros Indios name. It was under Puros Indios Cigars that Rolando Reyes Jr purchased the 35 Acre land in the Redlands. He moved into the main house with a ten-acre parcel with mother, Zeida Reyes. He wanted sister's Oneida and Seida to occupy the remaining acres. Zeida Reyes lived in the main house for many years with daughter Seida Reyes. When Seida Reyes moved out of the main home, Oneida Reyes insisted on moving into the property, threw out older brother that resided in the ten acres, and took charge of the property. She moved her mother to live in the stables in the back of the property which was in poor conditions. She took over the land and now resides in the property with husband Enriquez Diez. Rolando Reyes Jr. promoted the Puros Indios Cigars and it was not well accepted by the Cuba Aliados Cigars Distributor known as JR. Distributors. Rolando Reyes Junior  resulting in the removal of that brand from the market for several years, leaving the company with only the new brand, Puros Indios, which was successful. In February 1996, Rolando Reyes Jr. formed a new company, Puros Indios Cigars, Inc., which took over the production and distribution of the Puros Indios brand. The dispute and lawsuit also resulted in a permanent rift between father and son that was later overcome and Rolando Reyes Junior returned to work at the Miami office. Ongoing conflicts with sister Oneida forced him to leave the company and initiate business elsewhere. The family business which was run by every member of the family was overtaken by Oneida and her sons. Rolando Reyes Jr., who departed and went his own way due to ongoing disputes with older sister Oneida. Oneida wanted to keep the company and all of the family inheritance to herself.

The suit was settled in late 1999, with the distribution rights to Cuba Aliados returned to Cigars by Santa Clara and Sr. Reyes' company, Puros Indios Cigars, Inc., retaining the distribution rights to the Puros Indios brand, thus returning Cuba Aliados cigars to market. In 2004, the distribution rights to the Cuba Aliados brand were regained by Sr. Reyes, once again giving him full control of all his established brands.

Honduras
A visit to Honduras convinced Sr. Reyes to move most of his operations to Danlí, Honduras, the move was completed in 1989. The factory was an old building that had originally been a twelve-room motel. This factory was in use for fourteen years. It eventually became too small, until a new, fully modern factory was built on the outskirts of Danlĺ, which opened in 2002. The old factory continues to serve as a box factory and as an aging facility for finished cigars.

The new Puros Indios factory allowed for an immediate increase in production to three times what the old factory could produce, turning out 30,000 cigars per day.  The rolling room, with room for 160 rollers, occupies the entire bottom floor. The second floor consists of 15 bulk tobacco storage rooms, seven cedar-lined aging rooms and three walk-in freezers for killing tobacco pests such as the Tobacco Beetle.

The factory sits on a  plot of land adjacent to the Reyes residence and farm, where Don Rolando grows food for himself and his family. He also often shares the output from this farm with his workers. Even at his advanced age (he turned 84 in 2007), Don Rolando works in the factory. Even though he works during the day, he also works after everyone else has gone home and he has the factory to himself, usually starting at 10 PM (2200 hrs) and often working to 5:00 AM (0500 hrs) the following morning. He prefers this time because it makes it easier to work without interruption. He inspects the day's production and if a roller fails to make cigars to quality standard, Don Rolando will leave the roller a cautionary note to improve.

Changes
This is a family business originated by Mr. Rolando Reyes Senior, wife Zeida Reyes, son and Rolando Reyes Junior. Rolando's son Rolando Jr. was the CEO of the company in Miami, New Jersey and Honduras for many years. There were some conflicts in the family initiated by sibling rivalry, and Rolando Junior went on his own. However, he was always in contact with father and received merchandise from the Honduras central office. Rolando's daughter, Seida Reyes Perez also ran the family business for a period of time but left the business to pursue her career in social services. The oldest daughter, Oneida Diez stayed kept on running the business and ultimately engaged her husband Enrique Diez to run the business with her. In late 2007, Don Rolando announced he was promoting his grandson, Carlos E. Diez, to be the company president. After many years doing business as Puros Indios Cigars, Inc., the new president changed the company name to Reyes Family Cigars, Inc., introduced a new corporate logo, cigar label art, and added three new cigar lines under the Reyes Family Cigar brand among other significant changes.

Recently, Reyes Family Cigars opened up production in Miami late in 2008 to allow the domestic operations staff to personally oversee an exclusive, limited development of the Cuba Aliados Miami.

Rolando Reyes died March 10, 2012, leaving behind his wife, in a nursing home, son Rolando Reyes Jr., daughter Seida Reyes Perez, and Oneida Diez. Three years later, May 2015 Zeida Reyes died without an announcement. She was hardly recognized but she was the strength behind Rolando's success. She was a dedicated mother, wife, and co-owner of the family business and properties. Rolando and Zeida Reyes worked side by side long hours to leave a legacy for their three children. They wanted to give their children the American dream. They worked so that in old age, their children would not have to struggle like they did. Rolando Reyes Jr. worked long hours alongside Rolando and Zeida. Rolando Jr. and Seida would go to work with parents straight from school. Rolando Jr. would often fall asleep while learning to roll the cigars. Seida Reyes worked side by side with mother putting the cellophane or rings in the cigars while Rolando Sr. and Junior prepared the cigars in the lower floor for the following day. Oneida Diez was home sleeping because she was allergic to the cigars and refused to work in the family business. This went on for years. Rolando Jr. eventually learned how to run the family business and became very successful in the tobacco industry. He was able to do what his father never did, to break through the traditional mom and pop store and take the business internationally. That is how the business grew which gave the opportunity to purchase a two family home located at 329 48th street. Rolando Reyes Sr. converted the front part of the home into the business. Rolando Sr. purchased a vacation home located in 111 NW 22nd street with the idea of converting the lower floor into a second business which was later named Puros Indios Cigars. The business was run by Rolando Jr. and later by Oneida Diez. However, due to ongoing conflicts between Oneida and mother Zeida, Rolando sr. demanded that Oneida leave the store. Rolando Jr. convinced parents to allow Oneida to return to work at the store and to pay off her home so that the children would not endure financial hardships. Many conflicts ensued throughout the years. Ugly family conflicts that went on for years. It was all due to struggle for power and money, something that Rolando and Zeida never taught them. Rolando and Zeida always tried to keep the peace between the family. Zeida always asked the children to love one another and to remember that they are family. Throughout the years, the conflicts worsened and eventually Rolando Jr. was forced to leave the company, was unable to find work in the tobacco industry because sister wrote letters using father's name to employers. Rolando Jr. was able to get up on his feet and start a new business away from the family.

After Zeida Reyes died three years ago, Oneida said that she would distribute the inheritance in equal parts, but she had to sell the properties. Three years later, she sold the properties and did not distribute the inheritance. She kept the inheritance to herself knowing that Rolando and Zeida Reyes worked all of their life to leave the tobacco legacy to their son Rolando Reyes Jr, the family business and properties to the three children, not one child. It is sad that in what initiated as a close family converted into a rivalry for money, power and fortune. It is said that Rolando and Zeida Reyes had faith that Oneida would do the right thing by distributing the inheritance in equal parts, but she failed to carry out their wishes.

References

1924 births
2012 deaths
People from Remedios, Cuba
Cigar makers
Cuban emigrants to the United States
American expatriates in Honduras